Charles Kaisin (5 December 1972) is a Belgian designer.

Biography
Kaisin is a designer whose work explores the processes that generate a form. He graduated from the Royal College of Art in 2001, in Ron Arad's studio in London, after having completed an Architecture degree in Brussels.

After two internships in Jean Nouvel's studio in Paris then with Tony Cragg in 1997, he took part in an exchange program with the Kyoto University for the Arts in 2000 during which he conducted research on new materials.

Kaisin made recycling one of his favourite themes. Its niche: create objects with a contemporary design from recycled materials.

Next to designing objects, Kaisin deals with interior design and is artistic director for fashion shows. He has carried out projects for the offices in Paris of Louvre Abu Dhabi, for Swatch, for the MAC's (Museum of Contemporary Art Grand-Hornu, Belgium), for the luxury house Delvaux, Royal Boch and for the fashion brand Chine Collection.

Kaisin teaches design at Saint-Luc, Architecture School in Brussels.

Work
In his work on recycling, Kaisin transforms an empty bottle in a glass, he diverts the porthole of a washing machine in a bowl, designs furniture with newspaper material, creates clothes and bags from plastic shopping bags, so many topics to bring a different perspective on life and death of objects.

Kaisin found the inspiration for his K-bench in his Japanese experience. The honeycomb structure of this extensible bench revolutionizes many misconceptions in design but also in the use of materials. The K-bench can take many forms and be placed both inside and outside. Charles also made a newspaper version of the K-Bench.

For Royal Boch, Kaisin creates reversible trays and plates, where the movement is bound to the function to initiate another way to share the art of the table.

He also designed the inside wing of MACs (Museum of Contemporary Art in Grand-Hornu, Belgium), chocolates for Pierre Marcolini and created a bag for Delvaux.

Surrealist Dinner 
Since 2012, Charles Kaisin has been working on a new concept of Surrealist Dinners. These combine extravagance, fine cuisine and renowned scenography.

The first edition took place in his own workshop, in order to thank the Guerrand family. Since then, the concept has been constantly expanding.

Every year, the designer takes his guests into a surreal world. Personalities are invited to places that have become more atypical as the editions progress; a metro train, the remains of the Citroën garage, the Brussels Town Hall.

He decided to organize this event in honour of contemporary art. For him, this current represents a vector of communication and a source of inspiration in his daily life. According to the designer, this art is a reflection of the reality of today's world.

The themes and place, kept secret until dinner day, change every year and make us discover a different state of mind.

Many major brands also use Charles' creativity to organize Surrealist Dinners such as; Ice Watch (October 2016), Rolls Royce (October 2016), Louis Roederer (October 2017), Casino de Monte-Carlo (The game of love, December 2017), Brussels Exclusive Labels (September 2017)...

Architecture 
Charles Kaisin is known for a variety of creative projects, including interior design projects, installations and product design but also architecture in general.

Marrakech, known for its souks and lively squares but above all for its architecture, is the city that the designer has chosen to share his creativity. The "Almaha Marrakech Riad" is located in the oldest district of Marrakech, the Kasbash, where the royal stables were once located. This new Riad with 12 individually styled rooms is a quiet refuge totally designed by the Belgian designer.

Exhibition 

To come :
Collectible Pioneering design fair ( Brussels ): March 2019
On-going and recent :
Grand Palais (Paris) : exhibition of hairy chair
Mudam (Museum for Modern Art, Luxembourg): K-Bench
Carrousel du Louvre (Paris) : Newspaper Bench
Kyoto Art Center : recycled paper chair
Internationales Design Zentrum Berlin : Retrospective 
Museum for Contemporary Arts, Grand-Hornu, Belgium : Retrospective

References

 Lise Coirier, Label-design.be, Design in Belgium after 2000, edition Stichting Kunstboek, p167-168, 2006;
 From A to Z - made in Belgium, edition MMAP p. 160-161, 2001;
 Jean-Louis Gaillemin, Design contre design, deux siècles de création. edition RMN, p. 311 hairy chair, 2007;
 Marianne Hublet, Les rêves extensibles de Charles Kaisin, in Weekend le Vif - L’Express, July 2004;
Paulo Mariotti, « Eco Design » in Vogue Brasil, February 2006

External links
 Official site Charles Kaisin

1972 births
Living people
Belgian designers